INS Mysore is a  guided-missile destroyer currently in active service with the Indian Navy.

History
INS Mysore was built at Mazagon Dock Limited in Mumbai. Her keel was laid down in February 1991 and she was launched on 4 June 1993. Sea trials began in the Arabian Sea in March 1999, and she was commissioned on 2 June 1999 by then Prime Minister of India, Shri Atal Bihari Vajpayee. Her first CO was Captain Rajiv Dhamdhere.

She is the successor to  that served in the Indian Navy from 1957 to 1985. Her crest features a double-headed eagle (Gandaberunda) from the sigil of the erstwhile House of Wodeyar of Mysuru.

Service History

Colombo, 2008
In August 2008, Mysore along with the destroyer , were anchored just outside Sri Lankan territorial waters to provide security for the Indian prime ministers Dr Manmohan Singh, and other high-ranking officials at the 15th SAARC summit.

Gulf of Aden, 2008

In November 2008, Mysore was deployed to the Gulf of Aden to replace the frigate  as part of the Indian Navy's efforts to combat piracy off Somalia.
On 13 December 2008, Mysore captured 23 sea pirates along with arms and ammunition when the pirates were trying to capture MV Gibe, a ship sailing under the Ethiopian flag.

Libya, 2011

On 26 February 2011, Mysore deployed with the amphibious transport dock  to the Mediterranean Sea under Operation Safe Homecoming to evacuate Indian citizens from Libya in the aftermath of the turmoil from the 2011 Libyan civil war. They carried their full air wings and a contingent of Marine special forces.

Indian Ocean, Independence Day Weekend 2011
On 12 August 2011, the Indian Navy discovered an Iranian cargo vessel, Nafis-1, was off course. After two days of surveillance, it was suspected that the ship was hijacked by pirates. On 14 August, Mysore was called in to intercept the ship. The crew of nine hijackers, frightened after seeing Mysore, did not attempt any resistance. A helicopter with nine MARCOS Marines on board was sent to detain the suspects. The pirates' automatic assault weapons were found hidden in storage aboard the hijacked vessel.

Persian Gulf, 2014

On 27 June 2014, Mysore deployed to Persian Gulf to evacuate Indians from Iraq during 2014 Northern Iraq offensive. During the operation, she was accompanied by the frigate  which deployed to the Gulf of Aden.

Relocation

The Delhi class destroyers will be re-based to the Eastern Naval Command, Visakhapatnam.

References

External links
 YouTube INS Mysore off Tas-Sliema (Malta) during March 2011 operations

Delhi-class destroyers
Destroyers of the Indian Navy
Ships built in India
1993 ships
Piracy in Somalia